The Surinamese National Badminton Club Championships, locally called in Dutch "Nationale Clubkampioenschappen" is the badminton league organized by the Surinaamse Badminton Bond (SBB) the governing body for the sport of badminton in Suriname, to crown the best badminton clubteams in Suriname.
There used to be different levels for teams, premier A-Class called "Hoofdklasse", First division called "1e Klasse" and a Second division called "2e Klasse".
For juniors there first used to be only an under-19 (U-19) age class, later changed in an under-21 (U-21) age class and under-17 (U-17) age class. From 2001 an under-15 (U-15) age class was added, but this changed in 2005 to an under-13 (U-13) age class.

The first official edition was held in 1964 and won by Badminton Club Paramaribo with BC Amicitia ending runners-up. The last edition to date has been held by the S.B.B. in 2017 for juniors U-13 and U-17 age groups. Prior to the first official championships there was a team club event in Suriname held from 1958 - 1960 followed up by an inter-club team Cup trophy event called the Shell Badminton Cup (Shell wisselbeker Toernooi) from 1963 till 1966. These were the inaugural National Club Championships for Suriname. For individual titles each year the S.B.B. is organizing the Surinamese National Badminton Championships and the Surinamese National Junior Badminton Championships.

Champions Hoofdklasse (Premier Class) A-Class

Champions Inaugural Inter-Club tournament "Championship of Paramaribo"

Champions Inaugural Shell Badminton Cup

Champions 1e klasse (First Division) B-Class

Champions Junior (Jeugd) Age Classes

External links
http://www.dbnl.org/tekst/stut004eers01_01/stut004eers01_01_0015.php
http://www.smesport.com/home/badminton/item/14965-finales-badminton-clubkampioenschappen-succesvol-afgerond
http://www.nga-earlygolf.nl/golfarchief/files/original/3f49188df4f4fbe85449d085a963e664.pdf

References

Badminton tournaments in Suriname